The Malayan flat-shelled turtle (Notochelys platynota) is a species of turtle found in Southeast Asia.

Distribution
Myanmar, Thailand, Cambodia, West Malaysia, Indonesia (Sumatra, Java, Borneo, Bangka), Vietnam, Singapore.
Type locality: "in India Orientali", later restricted to "Sumatra; Singapore" by Gray (1863:177).

References

 Buskirk, James 1997 The Malayan Flat-Shelled Turtle Notochelys platynota Vivarium 9 (1): 6–9;15
 Gray, J.E. 1834 Characters of several new species of freshwater tortoises (Emys) from India and China. Proc. Zool. Soc. London 2: 53-55
 Gray, J.E. 1863 Observations on the box tortoises, with the descriptions of three new Asiatic species. Proceedings of the Zoological Society of London 1863: 173-179
 Gray, J.E. 1864 Observations on the box tortoises, with the description of three new Asiatic species. Ann. Mag. Nat. Hist. (3) 13: 105-111
 Gray, J.E. 1873 On the original form, development, and cohesion of the bones of the sternum of chelonians; with notes on the skeleton of Sphargis. Ann. Mag. nat. Hist. (4) 11: 161-172
 Liat, Lim Boo & Das, Indraneil 1999 The turtles of Borneo and peninsular Malaysia. Kota Kinabalu, natural History Publications, 151 pp.

External links
 
 http://itgmv1.fzk.de/www/itg/uetz/herp/photos/Notochelys_platynota.jpg

Notochelys
Reptiles described in 1834
Taxa named by John Edward Gray